It's Got To Be Now is the fourth studio album by the Boston indie rock band Aloud. The album was co-produced by Charles Newman, Benny Grotto, and Aloud.

In a blog post, the band foreshadowed it would be "an album that sounds like a band playing music in a room together", a marked departure from the ornate Exile. It's Got To Be Now is Aloud's first album of new material with a permanent rhythm section since their 2008 album Fan The Fury. It is also the first Aloud album available on vinyl and their debut on Mother West.

Speaking with Vents Magazine before the album's release, Jen de la Osa and Henry Beguiristain remarked mortality, the urgency of living in the moment, and "trying to capture joy in a bottle" would be overarching themes on It's Got To Be Now.

On July 31, 2013, the band announced a Kickstarter campaign to fund the album. Throughout the campaign, live performances of songs "The Wicked Kind", the title track "It's Got To Be Now", "A Little Bit Low", and "Back Here With Me Again" were released. Acoustic versions of "Jeanne, It's Just a Ride!" and "Don't Let It Get You Down" were also posted. The project reached its funding goal on August 21, 2013.

The album's first single, "A Little Bit Low", premiered online in Elmore Magazine on December 20, 2013, with the music video debuting on February 15, 2015. A second single, the title track "It's Got To Be Now", debuted at GroundSounds on February 26, 2014.  A music video for the "Back Here With Me Again", the third single, was filmed at Aloud's Boston release show for the album, and was first posted July 22, 2014 on Vanyaland. It was the first video released in connection with It's Got To Be Now to feature the band.

Recording 

After recording "You Will Know" for the Berklee College of Music's BANDED project, Aloud found the prospect of working with Benny Grotto at Mad Oak Studios to be a very enjoyable, productive experience. The band reconvened at the studio to record "Such a Long Time" in December 2011. At the behest of Grotto, the band recorded the song in the same room without any click track, headphones, or separation of instruments. Plans were made throughout 2012 to return to Mad Oak with Grotto to record a follow-up to Exile once more songs had been written.

Aloud formally began sessions for It's Got To Be Now at Mad Oak nearly a year later. They recorded nine more songs over the course of two days in the studio. Percussionist Andy G. Wong was invited to record percussion with the band to maintain the live feel of the recording.

The following week, vocalists de la Osa and Beguiristain traveled to New York City to overdub vocals for the album at Serious Business Studios with producer Charles Newman.

Aloud held one more overdub session, at Mad Oak, on January 24, 2013 to overdub "some odds and ends", which included keyboards recorded by Maxwell Butler.

Track listing

It's Got To Be Now

This Will Make Sense Later: the It's Got To Be Now demos 

An exclusive collection of demos was released to backers who crowdfunded It's Got To Be Now via Kickstarter. The collection contains demos and alternate recordings for all but one song on the album ("Back Here With Me Again") plus the bonus track "You Will Know". Demos of two previously unreleased songs, "Edge City" and "(I Just Want) To Be Free", were also included. A studio version of "(I Just Want)" To Be Free was later released as the b-side to "Children of the Divine" and included on the City Lights EP in 2019.

Personnel
Aloud
 Henry Beguiristain: lead vocals, guitars
 Jen de la Osa: lead vocals, guitars
 Frank Hegyi: drums, percussion
 Charles Murphy: bass, backing vocals
Additional personnel
 Maxwell Butler: organ, piano
 Ryan Cornell: mixing
 Tony Eichler: mastering
 Benny Grotto: producer, recording engineer
 Thayer Harris: additional engineering on "Such a Long Time"
 Charles Newman: producer, mixing
 Mike Tucker: drums, percussion on "Such a Long Time"
 Andy G. Wong: live percussion

References

2014 albums
Aloud albums
Kickstarter-funded albums